U.S. Route 150 (US 150) in Kentucky is a  east–west highway that runs from the Indiana state line above the Ohio River to US 25/KY 1249 at Mount Vernon.

Route description

Louisville/Jefferson County
Starting on the Sherman Minton Bridge over the Ohio River, I-64 and US 150 enter the city of Louisville. Shortly after going through the bridge, both routes encounter I-264 at a directional T interchange. The freeway continues as an elevated freeway along the riverfront, passing the nearby McAlpine Locks and Dam. On the next exit, US 150 leaves the freeway and enters onto 22nd Street. The route runs through the neighborhood of Portland and Russell along this street. South of Griffiths Avenue, US 150 splits into a one-way pair, with eastbound traffic continuing to use 22nd Street and westbound traffic using Dr. W. J. Hodge (21st) Street and 22nd Street Connector. South of Main Street and Market Street, US 150 runs concurrently with US 31W and US 60. US 150 then turns eastward along Broadway, departing from US 31W/US 60.

In downtown, US 150 encounters I-65 between 1st Street and Brook Street. However, there are no direct connections to northbound and from southbound I-65. Just west of the Cave Hill Cemetery, US 150 turns southeast along US 31E (Baxter Avenue). Both routes soon turn southeast on Bardstown Road. The two routes then serve Strathmoor Manor, Strathmoor Village, Wellington, I-264 (Watterson Expressway), West Buechel, and I-265/KY 841 (Gene Snyder Freeway). South of I-265, the road becomes a four-lane divided roadway. The road reaches the city limit of Louisville shortly after intersecting with KY 660.

Mount Washington to Mount Vernon
After leaving Louisville and Jefferson County, US 31E/US 150 begins to bypass downtown Mount Washington. Just before intersecting with KY 44, the road downgrades to a four-lane undivided highway. Shortly thereafter, it then downgrades to two lanes. The two routes then serve Coxs Creek, and Nazareth. In Bardstown, both US 31E and US 150 split at a roundabout. Then, US 150 meets the Bluegrass Parkway (BG 9002) at a diamond interchange. The route then serves Fredericktown, St. Catharine, Springfield, and Texas. In Perryville, the route runs concurrently with US 68 for less than two blocks. KY 52 also begins to run concurrently with US 150.

In Danville, US 150 and KY 52 intersect US 127 Byp./US 150 Byp. (Danville Bypass). As both routes approach downtown, KY 34 and later US 127 briefly join in. After leaving downtown, KY 52 leaves US 150. After that, US 150 then enters onto a four-lane divided highway. This configuration is a continuation of the Danville Bypass. In Stanford, the route intersects with US 27 before returning to a two-lane undivided road. The route then serves Crab Orchard and Brodhead. In Mount Vernon, US 150 intersects with US 25/KY 1249. At this point, US 150 ends here.

Major intersections

References

 Kentucky
U.S. Highways in Kentucky
Transportation in Jefferson County, Kentucky
Transportation in Bullitt County, Kentucky
Transportation in Spencer County, Kentucky
Transportation in Nelson County, Kentucky
Transportation in Washington County, Kentucky
Transportation in Boyle County, Kentucky
Transportation in Lincoln County, Kentucky
Transportation in Rockcastle County, Kentucky